HMS Albury was a Hunt-class minesweeper of the Aberdare sub-class built for the Royal Navy during World War I. She was not finished in time to participate in the First World War and survived the Second World War to be sold for scrap in 1947.

Design and description
The Aberdare sub-class were enlarged versions of the original Hunt-class ships with a more powerful armament. The ships displaced  at normal load. The ships' complement consisted of 74 officers and ratings.

The ships had two vertical triple-expansion steam engines, each driving one shaft, using steam provided by two Yarrow boilers.

The Aberdare sub-class was armed with a quick-firing (QF)  gun forward of the bridge and a QF twelve-pounder (76.2 mm) anti-aircraft gun aft. Some ships were fitted with six- or three-pounder guns in lieu of the twelve-pounder. Albury was fitted with a single six-pounder gun in 1931, but by 1939 was listed as having an armament of 1 × 4 inch and 1 × 12-pounder gun.

Construction and career
HMS Albury was built by the Ailsa Shipbuilding Company at their shipyard in Troon, Ayrshire. She was launched on 21 November 1918, and commissioned on 17 February 1919. On 21 November 1919, Albury was laid up in reserve at the Nore.

Albury served in the 1st Minesweeping Flotilla in Home waters from 1927 to 1935. In 1939 Albury was in reserve at Malta, part of the 3rd Minesweeper Flotilla. On 3 March 1940, Albury was one of five minesweepers ordered back to British waters from the Mediterranean, joining the 5th Minesweeping Flotilla at Harwich on 2 April 1940. She took part in the Dunkirk evacuation, Operation Dynamo, from 28 May–4 June 1940, carrying out six evacuation trips and landing 1851 evacuees back in Britain. By June 1941, Albury was part of the 4th Minesweeping Flotilla. On 7 November that year, she was attacked by German bombers off the East coast of Scotland. She was near missed by German bombs, which caused minor machinery damage, which took five weeks to repair.

On 19 January 1942 Albury was involved in a collision with HMS Sutton, another Hunt-class minesweeper, and took serious damage. On 6 June 1944, Albury, still part of the 4th Minesweeping Flotilla, took part in Operation Overlord, the Allied invasion of Normandy.

From January 1945, Albury was laid up as part of the Reserve Fleet at Falmouth, and on 13 March 1947 was sold to Dohman & Habets of Liège, Belgium for mercantile conversion.

Pennant numbers

See also
 Albury is the name of a number of places in England

Notes

References
 
 
 
 
 
 
  
 
 

 

Hunt-class minesweepers (1916)
Royal Navy ship names
1918 ships